Escapar may refer to:

"Escapar", a song by Kudai from Vuelo (album), 2004
"Escapar", the Spanish-language version of "Escape" (Enrique Iglesias song), 2001